The Battle of Chedabucto occurred against Fort St. Louis in Chedabucto (present-day Guysborough, Nova Scotia) on June 3, 1690 during King William's War (1689–97). The battle was part of Sir William Phips and New England's military campaign against Acadia. New England sent an overwhelming force to conquer Acadia by capturing the capital Port Royal, Chedabucto, and attacking other villages. The aftermath of these battles was unlike any of the previous military campaigns against Acadia. The violence of the attacks alienated many of the Acadians from the New Englanders, broke their trust, and made it difficult for them to deal amicably with the English-speakers.

Historical context
Clerbaud Bergier led other merchants from La Rochelle, France in enjoying a fishing monopoly in Acadia. In 1682, Fort St. Louis was established by the Company of Acadia (Compagnie de la Peche Sedentaire) to protect the fishery. The principal port was at Chedabucto Bay, which accounted for fifty fishers in 1686. Dauphin de Montorgueil was the commandant at Fort Saint-Louis. Bergier's monopoly was contested by other Acadian merchants, among them Acadian governor Michel Leneuf de la Vallière de Beaubassin, who had been selling fishing licenses to New Englanders.

There were various intentions behind the New England attack on Acadia. Some wanted the expedition to lay the foundation for a profitable postwar relations with the Mi'kmaq and Acadians, while others sought only to punish them for their alleged complicity in recent attacks against New England.

Battle 
As part of Sir William Phips' expedition to capture the capital of Acadia Port Royal, Phips sent Captain Cyprian Southack to Chedabacto with 80 men to destroy Fort Saint-Louis and the surrounding French fishery. Louis-Alexandre des Friches de Meneval was stationed at the fort with 12 soldiers. The soldiers at Fort Saint-Louis, unlike those at Port Royal, put up a fight before surrendering. They tried to defend the fort for over six hours, until fire bombs burned the fort to the ground. Southack destroyed the enormous amount of 50,000 crowns of fish. The garrison capitulated on honorable terms and were sent to the French capital of Newfoundland, Plaisance.

Consequences
Phips also dispatched Capt. John Alden (sailor) who raided Cape Sable (present-day south-west Nova Scotia) as well as the villages around the Bay of Fundy, particularly Grand Pre and Chignecto.

France regained control of Port Royal the following year. Joseph Robineau de Villebon, one of Meneval's assistants, returned to Port Royal from France.  He reestablished French authority in Port Royal.

The Company of Acadia encountered a variety of difficulties on the way to its final dissolution in 1702. Fort Saint-Louis remained in use at Chedabucto until the community was destroyed in the Squirrel Affair (1718).

See also 
 Military history of Nova Scotia

References

Sources
 
 
 
Haynes, Mark. The Forgotten Battle: A History of the Acadians of Canso/ Chedabuctou. British Columbia: Trafford. 2004
 
Geoffrey Plank, An Unsettled Conquest. University of Pennsylvania. 2001
A Journal of The Proceedings In The Late Expedition To Port-Royal, On Board Their Majesties Ship, The Six Friends, The Honourable Sr. William Phipps Knight, Commander In Chief &c. A True Copy, Attested By Joshua Natstock Clerk.

Military history of Acadia
Military history of Nova Scotia
Military history of New England
Conflicts in Nova Scotia
Acadian history
Conflicts in Canada
Conflicts in 1690
King William's War
Battles involving England
Battles involving France